Zhang Kailin and Zheng Saisai were the defending champions, however Zheng chose not to participate. Zhang was scheduled to partner Han Xinyun, but withdrew before the tournament began, after retiring in her first round singles match due to injury.

Lee Ya-hsuan and Kotomi Takahata won the title after defeating Nicha Lertpitaksinchai and Jessy Rompies 6–2, 6–1 in the final.

Seeds

Draw

References 
 Draw

Dalian Women's Tennis Open - Doubles
2016 Doubles